The 1989–90 California Golden Bears men's basketball team represented the University of California, Berkeley as a member of the Pacific-10 Conference during the 1989–90 season.

Led by fourth-year head coach Lou Campanelli, the Bears finished the season with a record of 22–10, and a record of 12–6 in the Pac-10, placing them third. The Bears received an at-large bid to the NCAA tournament as No. 9 seed in the East region. After defeating Indiana in the opening round, Cal fell to No. 1 seed Connecticut in the second round.

Roster

Schedule and results

|-
!colspan=9 style=| Non-conference Regular Season

|-
!colspan=9 style=| Pac-10 Regular Season

|-
!colspan=9 style=| Pac-10 Tournament

|-
!colspan=9 style=| NCAA Tournament

References

California Golden Bears men's basketball seasons
California
California
California Golden Bear
California Golden Bear